The Frances River is a river of New Zealand. It arises near Lambert Col and flows south to join McCoy Stream to form the Clyde River. The Clyde flows into the Rangitata River, which eventually exits into the Pacific Ocean.

See also
List of rivers of New Zealand

References

Land Information New Zealand – Search for Place Names

Rivers of Canterbury, New Zealand
Rivers of New Zealand